This is a list of African cities and towns that have, or once had, town tramway (urban tramway, or streetcar) systems as part of their public transport system.

Algeria

Democratic Republic of the Congo

Egypt

Eritrea

Ethiopia

Ghana

Kenya

Libya

Madagascar

Mauritius

Morocco

Mozambique

Nigeria

Sierra Leone

South Africa

Spain (Islas Canarias / Canary Islands)

See List of town tramway systems in Spain.

Sudan

Tanzania

Tunisia

Zimbabwe

See also

 List of town tramway systems in Africa
 List of town tramway systems in Asia
 List of town tramway systems in Central America
 List of town tramway systems in Europe
 List of town tramway systems in Oceania
 List of town tramway systems in South America
 List of town tramway systems
 List of tram and light rail transit systems
 List of metro systems
 List of trolleybus systems
 Template:Suburban railways in Africa – current rail based systems in Africa.

References

Tram transport-related lists
 
Tram